The 1982 U.S. Figure Skating Championships took place in Indianapolis, Indiana, from January 22 to January 31, Medals were awarded in three colors: gold (first), silver (second), and bronze (third) in four disciplines – men's singles, ladies' singles, pair skating, and ice dancing – across three levels: senior, junior, and novice.

The event determined the U.S. team for the 1982 World Championships.

Senior results

Men

Ladies

Pairs

Ice dancing

Junior results

Men

Ladies

Pairs

Ice dancing

Novice results

Men

Ladies

Pairs

Ice dancing

References

External links
 1982 U.S. NATIONAL CHAMPIONSHIPS RESULTS

U.S. Figure Skating Championships
United States Figure Skating Championships, 1982
United States Figure Skating Championships, 1982
January 1982 sports events in the United States